Burnt Offerings is a 1976 American supernatural horror film co-written and directed by Dan Curtis and starring Karen Black, Oliver Reed and Bette Davis, and Lee H. Montgomery, with Eileen Heckart, Burgess Meredith and Anthony James in smaller roles. It is based on the 1973 novel of the same name by Robert Marasco. The plot follows a family who begins to interpersonally dissolve under supernatural forces in a large estate they have rented for the summer.

While the film received mixed reviews from critics, it won several awards in 1977. Originally set on Long Island, New York, the movie moves the action to California and was the first movie to be filmed at Dunsmuir House in Oakland, California.

Plot 
Writer Ben Rolf, his wife Marian, and their 12-year-old son Davey tour a large, shabby, remote neo-classical 19th-century mansion to rent for the summer. The home's eccentric owners, elderly siblings Arnold and Rosalyn Allardyce, offer them a bargain price of $900 for the entire summer, with one odd request: Their elderly mother, who they claim is 85 but could pass for 60, will continue to live in her upstairs suite, and the Rolfs are to provide her with meals during their stay. The old woman is obsessed with privacy and will not interact with them, so meals are to be left in her sitting room outside her locked bedroom.

The family arrives at the house on July 1 along with Ben's elderly Aunt Elizabeth. Marian becomes obsessed with caring for the home, and eventually wears the Victorian era garments she finds in Mrs. Allardyce's suite, while distancing herself from her family. Of particular interest to her is Mrs. Allardyce's sitting room, which contains a collection of framed portraits of people from different eras, presumably former occupants of the house. Mrs. Allardyce's meals go mostly untouched, according to the concerned Marian. Various unusual circumstances occur during the summer: After Davey falls and hurts his knee playing in the garden, a dead plant starts to grow again; Ben cuts his hand on a champagne bottle, and a dead light bulb is mysteriously repaired; while playing in the pool; Ben is haunted by a vision of an eerie, malevolently grinning hearse driver whom Ben first saw at his mother's funeral years earlier. With each "accident," the house further restores itself.

Marian is becoming possessed by the spirit of the house. When Aunt Elizabeth suddenly becomes ill and dies, Marian does not attend the funeral. Ben angrily confronts Marian about her obsession with the house. When she denies it, he reveals his intention to leave the next day.

Ben later sees old shingles and siding falling away, replaced by new ones as the house rejuvenates itself. Now convinced that the house is alive, Ben attempts to escape with Davey but a tree blocks the road. When Marian drives them back to the house, Ben accuses her of being a part of what is going on, then sees her as the chauffeur and becomes catatonic. The next day, while Davey is swimming and a still-catatonic Ben is watching him, the pool water turns into vicious waves, pulling the boy under as Ben is unable to move. Marian rescues her son; the incident awakens Ben from his catatonia. Marian agrees that it's time to leave but insists on going back inside to inform Mrs. Allardyce. When Marian fails to return to the car, Ben goes inside to find her, but cannot. He decides to confront Mrs. Allardyce, whom he has never seen. He is horrified when he discovers that Marian is Mrs. Allardyce, wizened by age, but clearly Marian. "I've been waiting for you, Ben!" she says, scowling at him.  Ben recoils in horror from the thing that had once been his wife rises from her wheelchair, and moves towards him.  Waiting in the car, Davey is shocked to see his father fall from attic window, landing on the car's windshield. In shock, Davey runs toward the house and is killed when one of the chimneys falls on him.

In the final shot of the film, the voices of the Allardyce siblings are heard marveling at the restored beauty of their home and rejoicing over the return of their "mother". With the house and grounds now apparently rejuvenated, camera pans on pictures arrayed in the house, previous guests, presumably also victims of the house. The photo collection now includes photos of Ben, Davey and Aunt Elizabeth.

Cast

Production 
In a Variety piece published on December 11, 1969, it was announced a project named Burnt Offerings would be directed by Bob Fosse from a screenplay by Robert Marasco; Turman Films and Cinema Center Films would be producers and Lawrence Turman executive producer. Although it never materialized, a novel of the same name by Marasco was published in 1973. The American Film Institute inductively reasoned the book may have been written based on the un-produced screenplay.

Burnt Offerings was directed by Dan Curtis, most known for television horror works such as the TV series Dark Shadows (1966–1971) and made-for-TV films like The Night Stalker (1972). Not counting House of Dark Shadows (1970) and Night of Dark Shadows (1971) —theatrically released feature film adaptations of the TV series— it was the only original theatrical feature he ever directed. When offered to do the project, he found the novel uninteresting, particularly what he called its "nothing" ending, and joked to himself, "I bet some idiot who doesn't know what he's doing will come along and make this."

William F. Nolan removed the first third of the book where the family was in New York City, finding it didn't work, and the chauffeur was conceived by him and unique to the film.

Filming took place in August 1975 at the Dunsmuir House located in Oakland, California. Burnt Offerings was the first movie to be filmed at the Dunsmuir House. According to a commentary with Dan Curtis, William F. Nolan, and Karen Black, Curtis reveals that his rationale for the fog machine was to shoot "motes."

Bette Davis reportedly had conflicts with Karen Black, feeling that Black did not extend to her an appropriate degree of respect and that her behavior on the film set was unprofessional.

Critical reception 
Arizona Republic critic Mike Petryni was creeped out by the film, particularly the smiling chauffeur, but felt it was ruined by an emphasis on constant thrills over subtle horror. He also was confused about several concepts, such as why Marian was handling Mrs. Allardyce's trays. George Anderson of the Pittsburgh Post-Gazette criticized the film as dependent on typical horror tropes such as shocks and loud music hits; he also described the tension as "a lot of sinister huffing and puffing to little effect", noting how most of the runtime is spent on mystery of which characters are the antagonists or protagonists.

While calling Meredith and Heckart the best performers in the film, Richard Dyer of The Boston Globe argued the material gave the actors little to work with; he called Black "particularly inconsistent", Reed "looking like an eggplant", and stated Davis "tries to create a Bette Davis character without any Bette Davis lines to work with, so all she can do is puff and snort a lot".

Movie critic Roger Ebert called the film "a mystery, all right", concluding "Burnt Offerings just persists, until it occurs to us that the characters are the only ones in the theater who don't know what's going to happen next." Variety stated "The horror is expressed through sudden murderous impulses felt by Black and Reed, a premise which might have been interesting if director Dan Curtis hadn't relied strictly on formula treatment."

Awards

Retrospective reviews 
Rovi Donald Guarisco of Movie Guide called the film "worthy of rediscovery by the horror fans who missed it the first time", concluding "In the end, Burnt Offerings is probably a bit too methodical in its pacing for viewers accustomed to slam-bang approach of post-'70s horror fare but seasoned horror fans will find plenty to enjoy..." In addition to the slow build, Starbursts Robert Martin spotlighted its cast, particularly the chemistry between Reed and Montgomery, Black's "loving and murderous" combination, and Davis' "uncomfortable" heart attack scene. However, he also felt the overall product was held back by its TV film look, particularly its "flat cinematography" and visuals that were more "clever" than scary.

Analysis 
Burnt Offerings was part of a trend in 1970s horror films focused on the supernatural, such as The Omen (1976), Carrie (1976), Audrey Rose (1977), and The Amityville Horror (1979). It also was one of many horror films in the 1970s and early 1980s, such as The Texas Chainsaw Massacre (1974) and Poltergeist (1982), presenting the negative impacts of middle class life, such as empty-headed consumerism; in the film, the family is destroyed by a house they otherwise dreamed of, generic-looking, in the middle of nowhere, and meant for leisure. In the 1978 book An Introduction to American Movies, Steven C. Earley cited Ben's fall onto a car window as an example of the high presence of violence in films of the 1970s. Retrospective reviews viewed the story as a criticism on obsession on property ownership and the destruction of the nuclear family.

Home media 
On August 26, 2003, MGM Home Entertainment released a region 1 DVD of Burnt Offerings. The original video shape is in wide screen (16:9) and also features an audio commentary with Dan Curtis, Karen Black and William F. Nolan. The DVD was poorly received. Reviewers criticized the video quality, which appeared to have been shot with soft focus, and the Dolby Digital Mono audio that made the voices muddy and indistinct.

A Blu-ray of the film was released on October 6, 2015 by Kino Lorber.

Soundtrack 

Like most other Dan Curtis works, the music for Burnt Offerings was composed and conducted by Robert Cobert. In 2011, years after the film's release, the original full soundtrack album was released by Counterpoint and was limited to only 3,000 copies. The album features all of Cobert's original score, plus alternate tracks not used in the film including two alternate Music Box Themes. The CD booklet is 20 pages long and illustrated with photos taken from the set of the film during production. An original suite of the film's soundtrack can be found on the 2000 Robert Cobert collection album The Night Stalker and Other Classic Thrillers.

Track listing

References

External links 
 
 
 
 

1976 films
1976 horror films
American supernatural horror films
1970s English-language films
Films based on American horror novels
Films directed by Dan Curtis
American haunted house films
United Artists films
Films set in California
Films set in country houses
Films shot in California
1970s American films